Frank Moore Colby (February 10, 1865 – March 3, 1925) was an American educator and writer.

Biography
He was born in Washington, D. C. He graduated from Columbia University in 1888, was acting professor of history at Amherst College in 1890-91, lecturer on history at Columbia and instructor in history and economics at Barnard College from 1891 to 1895, and professor of economics at New York University thereafter until 1900.

Between 1893 and 1895 he was a member of the editorial staff of Johnson's Universal Cyclopaedia in the department of history and political science, and in 1898 he became editor of the International Year Book and one of the editors of the International Cyclopedia (1884). The International Cyclopedia was renamed New International Encyclopedia, and Colby was an editor of the 1st edition (1902) and the 2nd edition (1914).

His other literary work comprises editorial writing for the New York Commercial Advertiser 1900-02, "The Book of the Month" in the North American Review (1913- ), as well as critical articles for the Bookman and other magazines.  He wrote: 
Outlines of General History, (1900);
Imaginary Obligations, (1904); and
Constrained Attitudes, (1910).

External links

 Quotes from Frank Moore Colby

1865 births
1925 deaths
American book editors
American educators
American encyclopedists
American historians
Writers from New York (state)
Writers from Washington, D.C.
Columbia College (New York) alumni
Amherst College faculty
Columbia University faculty
New York University faculty